Tomáš Rod (born April 26, 1988) is a Czech professional ice hockey forward for IHC Písek of the 2nd Czech Republic Hockey League.

Rod previously played 50 games in the Czech Extraliga, playing for BK Mladá Boleslav, Motor České Budějovice and HC Pardubice. Having previously played for IHC Písek in 2010 and 2012, he rejoined the team on July 9, 2020.

References

External links

1988 births
Living people
HC Benátky nad Jizerou players
Bisons de Neuilly-sur-Marne players
Motor České Budějovice players
Czech ice hockey forwards
KLH Vajgar Jindřichův Hradec players
BK Mladá Boleslav players
HC Most players
HC Dynamo Pardubice players
Sportspeople from Písek
IHC Písek players
SK Horácká Slavia Třebíč players
HC Slovan Ústečtí Lvi players
HC Stadion Litoměřice players
HC Tábor players
HC Vrchlabí players
Czech expatriate ice hockey people
Czech expatriate sportspeople in France
Expatriate ice hockey players in France